Battalgazi, formerly and colloquially Eskimalatya,  is a town and district of Malatya Province of Turkey. The mayor is Selahattin Gürkan (AKP).

The town center corresponds to the previous location of Malatya proper, at a distance of 20 km from the modern day urban center and provincial seat of Malatya. The town was renamed in honor of Battal Gazi during the Republican period.

See also
 Battal Gazi

References

Populated places in Malatya Province
Districts of Malatya Province
Kurdish settlements in Turkey